William Herbert "Buckshot" May (December 13, 1899 – March 15, 1984) was a Major League Baseball pitcher who appeared in one game for the Pittsburgh Pirates in 1924.  The 24-year-old right-hander stood 6'2" and weighed 169 lbs.
  
On May 9, 1924, May came in to pitch the top of the 9th inning in a home game against the Boston Braves at Forbes Field.  He pitched a scoreless inning, with one strikeout, but the Pirates lost 10–7.  His lifetime ERA stands at 0.00.

His manager was future Hall of Famer Bill McKechnie.  Other notable teammates who would one day be members of the Baseball Hall of Fame were Max Carey, Kiki Cuyler, Rabbit Maranville, and Pie Traynor.

May died in his hometown of Bakersfield, California at the age of 84.

External links
Baseball Reference
Retrosheet

Major League Baseball pitchers
Baseball players from Bakersfield, California
Pittsburgh Pirates players
Pueblo Braves players
1899 births
1984 deaths